Maloye Vysokovo is a rural locality (a village) in Oktyabrskoye Rural Settlement, Vyaznikovsky District, Vladimir Oblast, Russia. The population was 265 as of 2010.

Geography 
Maloye Vysokovo is located 25 km southwest of Vyazniki (the district's administrative centre) by road. Bolshevysokovo is the nearest rural locality.

References 

Rural localities in Vyaznikovsky District